A Seat at the Table is the third studio album by American singer-songwriter Solange. It was released on September 30, 2016, by Saint Records and Columbia Records. While recording the album, Solange released an EP, titled True (2012) and launched her own record label named Saint Records. Writing for the album began as early as 2008, while the recording sessions took place from 2013 to June 2016. Solange enlisted a variety of collaborators including rappers Lil Wayne and Q-Tip; singer-songwriters The-Dream, BJ the Chicago Kid, Kelly Rowland and Tweet; and musicians Sampha, Kelela and David Longstreth.

A Seat at the Table was widely acclaimed by music critics and became Solange's first number-one album on the Billboard 200 in the United States, debuting with 46,000 copies sold (72,000 with additional album-equivalent units). The album's lead single, "Cranes in the Sky", won the Grammy for Best R&B Performance, becoming Solange's first Grammy nomination and win. In 2020, the album was ranked at 312 on Rolling Stone 500 Greatest Albums of All Time list.

Background 
In 2009, in an interview with MTV, Solange revealed that she was determining the type of sound for the follow-up to Sol-Angel and the Hadley St. Dreams. Solange rented a house in Santa Barbara, California to get into a certain state of mind while writing and making music. In an interview with Vibe on July 7, 2010, Solange said she suffered "a little bit of a breakdown" while recording her new album: "I literally gave up my sanity for a while to do this record. ... We literally were waking up in the morning and just making music all day and all night. ... It just started to wear on me in so many different ways. I started having these crazy panic attacks." Solange explained how she made sacrifices "mentally, emotionally and financially", and continued, "It's more than an album to me. It's a transitional time in my life." While still working on her third studio album, Solange released an EP titled True, for digital download on iTunes November 27, 2012. On May 14, 2013, Solange announced that she had launched her own record label named Saint Records, which she will be using to release her third full-length album and future music projects distributed through Sony.

On May 15, 2015, Solange performed a new song at an HBO-sponsored event. The song, which is titled "Rise" was inspired by police killings in Ferguson and Baltimore and the subsequent protests. The song is the opening track on the album and is a funk song that utilizes synth. The day after the performance, Solange revealed she has written twenty-four songs for her third studio album; the songs were written to piano, with Solange structuring them on her own before finding the producers to finish them. In July 2015, Solange announced that her third studio album was nearly complete, and that she was laying low on the performance side until her new music was complete, however she made an exception performing at the FYF festival. On her thirtieth birthday, she stated that she completed A Seat at the Table, her third studio album (fourth overall) three days before her birthday, on June 21, 2016. On September 27, 2016, Solange announced via her Twitter account: "I am overwhelmed with gratitude & excitement to share this work I've written and created, with you... #ASeatAtTheTable" on September 30, 2016. In a statement, Solange described the new album as "a project on identity, empowerment, independence, grief and healing." She had reportedly been working on the album since 2013.

Recording 
In the early days of recording sessions, Solange experimented with different sounds and ideas, which did not feature on the official track listing but did inform her on creating the album's identity, sound, early lyrics and concepts.
The initial conception of the album happened on Long Island and in New Orleans where she began to collaborate on ideas with various artists. Solange stated that during these stages it was just her "singing a melody" or "somebody playing her a synth or bass line that would turn into an hour-long track". Following these sessions, Solange traveled to New Iberia in Louisiana along with the hour long tracks. Solange went there with her engineers and began creating the songs' actual structures, building the sounds, writing the lyrics and creating melodies. Eventually, Solange took these tracks to Los Angeles to collaborate with Raphael Saadiq and Troy Johnson, stating: "When I look back at the beginning stages, I remember the powerful energy that set the tone, and that I'm so grateful followed us everywhere during the creation of this record."

Solange wrote "Cranes in the Sky" eight years prior to the album's release. In 2008, producer and singer Raphael Saadiq handed Solange a CD with a few instrumentals on it. One consisted of just drums, strings and bass. That night Solange returned to her hotel and wrote "Cranes in the Sky". Eight years later when Solange had finished writing and creating A Seat at the Table in New Iberia, Louisiana she revisited "Cranes in the Sky". Shortly after that she called Raphael and asked if he would help to produce a few of the other songs of the album.
American rapper Master P worked on the majority of the album's interludes with Solange. Solange contacted Master P and asked if he would narrate some of the album's songs; the interludes were created from conversation regarding the world's issues.

Music and lyrics 
The album's themes include rage, despair and empowerment. It comprises funk, neo soul, psychedelic soul and contemporary R&B. The album opens with 90-second long track "Rise" released a year earlier. "Weary" is a track filled with organs, guitar and bass and speaks about weariness and loneliness. "Borderline (An Ode to Self-Care)" has the same theme. "Interlude: The Glory Is in You" has the theme of finding self-peace. "Cranes in the Sky" is an upbeat track that speaks about attempts to alleviate the pain in alcohol, sex, music or even running away. In the following interview, Solange's father and former manager Mathew Knowles speaks about his childhood filled with integration, segregation and racism, which left him "angry for years". "Mad", featuring Lil Wayne, is a track about indignation and anger. "Don't You Wait" contains elements of funk, drums and bass and contains a statement from Solange's mother Tina Lawson. "Don't Touch My Hair" comprises electronic and funk music and explores a common experience for African-American women. Following interlude speaks about worth and independence. "F.U.B.U." is a nod to 1990s fashion label For Us By Us. The following interlude has the message "Don't let anybody steal your magic". "Don't Wish Me Well" contains elements of electronic and psychedelic soul music. "Pedestals" also has a theme of self-care. "Scales" is a down-tempo track. Also, all lyrics were written alongside images in an accompanying digital art book, released on Solange's official website.

Release and promotion 
A Seat at the Table was released on September 30, 2016, for digital download and streaming through Solange' recording label Saint Records and distributed through Columbia Records and Sony Music Entertainment. Its physical release was November 18, 2016 on CD, and December 9, 2016 on LP.

The album was promoted with two music videos, directed by Solange and her husband Alan Ferguson, "Don't Touch My Hair" and "Cranes in the Sky" premiered on October 3, 2016. Solange performed both songs on Saturday Night Live on November 5, 2016. On December 8, Solange was interviewed by Helga Davis on the Q2 Podcast. She performed a medley of "Rise" and "Weary" on The Tonight Show Starring Jimmy Fallon on December 15, 2016. On January 10, 2017, Solange was interviewed by her sister Beyoncé for Interview. On February 9, Solange' interview with Elle was released. She also performed at the 2017 Essence, Glastonbury, WayHome, Panorama, and Pitchfork festivals. She has also embarked on her "Orion's Rise" performance art tour, fusing music and art in performances at select theaters, including the art piece "Scales" in the city of Marfa, Texas, during Chinati Foundation Weekend.

Critical reception 

A Seat at the Table was met with widespread critical acclaim. At Metacritic, which assigns a normalized rating out of 100 to reviews from mainstream publications, the album received an average score of 89, based on 26 reviews.

Reviewing the album in Rolling Stone, Maura Johnston described it as a "fantastic-sounding LP that takes sonic cues from dusty soul sides while sounding as timely as a freshly sent tweet". Financial Times critic Ludovic Hunter-Tilney said like Beyoncé's Lemonade album, "A Seat at the Table explores themes of prejudice and blackness. But it does so in a different register, setting [Solange's] deft soprano to an updated version of psychedelic funk and soul." Emily Mackay from The Guardian wrote, "[Solange has] long been engagingly outspoken on issues of race, and from the title down, A Seat at the Table is an intensely personal testament to black experience and culture; the likes of 'F.U.B.U.,' 'Mad,' 'Don't Touch My Hair' and interludes in which her parents talk about their encounters with racism go deep. Sonically, the album's take on modern psychedelic soul is languid, rich, lifted by airy, Minnie Riperton–esque trills on the gorgeous likes of 'Cranes in the Sky' or the darkly glimmering 'Don't Wish Me Well'; it's a world away from 2008's peppier, poppier Sol-Angel and the Hadley St. Dreams or 2012's indie-crossover-hit True EP. Guest spots from artists as diverse as Lil Wayne, Sampha, Tweet and Kelela only serve to amplify Solange's fascinating voice. It's safe to say that though big sis Beyoncé has run her close recently, she's once more the most intriguing Knowles sibling." Gerrick D. Kennedy from Los Angeles Times wrote: "Those two worlds of black existence — at home and in the world at large — serves [sic] as the basis for Solange Knowles' exquisite, sumptuous new album, A Seat at the Table." BET.com gave the album a positive review, stating: "Thankfully, Solange's A Seat at the Table is the journal we don't get the time to write, the conversations we don't get to have and the exclamations we're too tired to repeat."

Some reviewers expressed reservations. Andy Gill from The Independent credited Knowles for acknowledging "a world beyond romantic cliche", but concluded "there's little punch or pop charm to the album, which boasts a surfeit of luscious textures and feisty attitudes, but a shortfall of killer melodies." Robert Christgau was less enthusiastic about the album after listening to it several times: "I assume its rep isn't just some mass delusion—that there's something there, and that it has to do with black female identity. But it left me unmoved, indeed untouched, and I'm not gonna lie about it." Tom Hull observed "a big production with scores of writers, producers, and guests, but the sound hardly suggests such scale, and the songs are laced with a male commentary which while interesting in its own right could just as well belong to a completely different album."

Year-end and other lists

Commercial performance 
A Seat at the Table debuted at number one on the US Billboard 200, becoming her first album to reach the top of the chart, and also topped the US Top R&B/Hip-Hop Albums chart. It debuted with 72,000 album-equivalent units, out of which 46,000 were pure album sales and 24,000 streaming and track equivalent units. As the album reached number one, Solange and Beyoncé became the first sisters, who are both solo artists, to achieve number one albums on the Billboard 200 in the same calendar year. On January 17, 2019, the album was certified gold by the Recording Industry Association of America (RIAA) for combined sales and album-equivalent units of over 500,000 units in the United States.

It also became her first album to chart in several countries. In United Kingdom, it peaked at number seventeen on UK Albums Chart, number two on UK R&B Albums Chart and number eight on UK Digital Albums, all published by the Official Charts Company (OCC). It also peaked at number sixty-six on Scottish Albums Chart, also published by OCC. It peaked at number twenty-one on Australian Albums Chart, published by the Australian Recording Industry Association (ARIA). In Belgium, it peaked at number fifty-three on Ultratop Flanders album chart and number eighty-three on Ultratop Wallonia album chart. It reached top forty in Norway and Sweden, peaking at numbers thirty-two and thirty-nine, respectively. It reached top thirty in New Zealand and Netherlands, peaking at numbers twenty-three and twenty-five, respectively. It also reached the top ten on the Canadian Albums Chart.

Track listing 

Notes
 "Interlude: The Glory Is in You", "Interlude: For Us by Us", "Interlude: No Limits", "Interlude: Pedestals" and "Closing: The Chosen Ones" are performed by Master P.
 "Interlude: Dad Was Mad" is performed by Mathew Knowles.
 "Interlude: Tina Taught Me" is performed by Tina Knowles.
 "Interlude: This Moment" is performed by Master P, Kelsey Lu, Sampha and Devonte Hynes.
 "Rise" features additional vocals by Raphael Saadiq.
 "Weary" features additional vocals by Tweet.
 "Mad" features additional vocals by The Dream, Moses Sumney and Tweet.
 "Don't You Wait" features additional vocals by Olugbenga.
 "Where Do We Go" features additional vocals by Sean Nicholas Savage.
 "F.U.B.U." features additional vocals by Tweet.
 "Junie" features uncredited vocals by André 3000.
 "Borderline (An Ode To Self Care)" contains a portion of the composition "More Than a Woman", written by Stephen Garrett and Tim Mosley.

Personnel
 
 Nia Andrews – featured artist (track 15), interlude performance (track 15)
 Ray Angry – production (track 1)
 Jake Aron – additional recording engineer
 Thayod Ayusar – additional recording engineer
 Adam Baindridge – production (tracks 7, 10, 18), guitar (track 7), additional synth editing (track 4), additional vocal editing (track 20)
 Rostam Batmanglij – piano (track 13), organ (track 13), shaker (track 13), additional horn production (track 13)
 Casey Benjamin – keyboards (track 14)
 Mikaelin 'Blue' BlueSpruce – recording engineer, mixing
 Bobby Campbell – additional recording engineer
 BJ the Chicago Kid – featured artist (track 13)
 Rogét Chahayed – synths (track 4)
 Bryndon Cook – production (tracks 8, 9), additional bass (track 9), additional cowbell (track 9) 
 Josh David – bass (track 14)
 The Dream – featured artist (track 13), additional vocals (track 6)
 "J Sounds" Holt – additional recording engineer
 Devonte Hynes – interlude performance (track 10)
 Hotae Alexander Jang – additional recording engineer
 Troy "R8dio" Johnson – associate producer, production (tracks 7, 21), bass (track 7), recording engineer
 Gloria Kaba – additional recording engineer
 Kelela – featured artist (track 20)
 John Kirby – production (tracks 12, 16, 17), synths (tracks 4, 16), piano (track 14)
 Mathew Knowles – interlude performance (track 5)
 Solange Knowles – lead artist, executive producer, production (tracks 1-14, 16-21), piano (track 19), interlude performance (track 15)
 Tina Knowles – interlude performance (track 8)
 Dave Kutch – mastering
 Kwes – production (tracks 7, 11, 18, 20)
 Lil Wayne – featured artist (track 6)
 Dave Longstreth – production (tracks 5-7, 13, 18, 20), guitar (track 7)
 Kelsey Lu – interlude performance (track 10)
 Majical Cloudz – production (track 1)
 Master P – interlude performance (tracks 3, 10, 12, 17, 19, 21)
 Olugbenga – production (track 7), bass (track 7), additional vocals (track 7)
 Ken Oriole – additional recording engineer
 Kevin Peterson – mastering assistance
 Q-Tip – featured artist (track 14), production (track 14), keyboards (track 14), drums (track 14)
 Questlove – production (track 1)
 Sam Robles – saxophone (track 9)
 Kelly Rowland – featured artist (track 15), interlude performance (track 15)
 Steve Rusch – additional recording engineer
 Raphael Saadiq – executive producer, production (tracks 1-6, 11, 16), additional bass (tracks 1, 9, 14), additional vocals (track 1)
 Sampha – featured artist (track 9), production (tracks 7-9, 18), interlude performance (track 10)
 Sean Nicholas Savage – production (track 11), additional vocals (track 11)
 Chris Sholar – guitar (track 14)
 Leon Silva – horns (track 21)
 Todd Simon – trumpet (track 9), flugelhorn (track 9)
 Sir Dylan – production (tracks 2, 3, 5, 6, 11), additional synth (track 1)
 Dave Andrew Sitek – production (tracks 8, 9)
 Moses Sumney – additional vocals (track 6)
 Tweet – additional vocals (tracks 2, 6, 13)
 Vic Wainstein – additional recording engineer
 Blair Wells – additional recording engineer
 Dontae Williams – horns (track 21)
 Kevin Williams – horns (track 21)
 Patrick Wimberly – production (tracks 8, 9, 11, 20), bass (track 7), additional synth (track 1)
 Nino Villanueva – recording engineer

Charts

Weekly charts

Year-end charts

Certifications

Release history

References

External links 
 

2016 albums
Solange Knowles albums
Columbia Records albums
Albums produced by Raphael Saadiq
Albums produced by Questlove
Albums produced by Q-Tip (musician)
Albums produced by Rostam Batmanglij
Albums produced by Dave Sitek
Albums produced by David Longstreth
Albums produced by Patrick Wimberly
Albums produced by Kwes
Surprise albums